Park Jeong-ja (born 11 February 1949) is a South Korean diver. She competed in two events at the 1968 Summer Olympics.

References

1949 births
Living people
South Korean female divers
Olympic divers of South Korea
Divers at the 1968 Summer Olympics
20th-century South Korean women